The 2020–21 Saint Mary's Gaels men's basketball team represented Saint Mary's College of California during the 2020–21 NCAA Division I men's basketball season. The team were led by head coach Randy Bennett in his 20th season at Saint Mary's. The Gaels played their home games at the University Credit Union Pavilion in Moraga, California as members of the West Coast Conference. They finished the season 14-10, 4-6 to finish in 7th place. They defeated Pepperdine in the quarterfinals in the WCC Tournament before losing in the semifinals to Gonzaga. They received an invitation to the NIT where they lost in the first round to Western Kentucky.

Previous season
The Gaels finished the 2019–20 season 26–8, 11–5 in WCC play to finish in a tie for third place. They defeated Pepperdine and BYU to advance to the championship game of the WCC tournament where they lost to Gonzaga. Despite being a virtual lock to receive an at-large bid to NCAA tournament, all postseason play was cancelled amid the COVID-19 pandemic.

Offseason

Departures

Incoming transfers

2020 recruiting class

2021 recruiting class

Roster

Schedule and results

|-
!colspan=9 style=| Non-conference regular season

|-
!colspan=9 style=| WCC regular season

|-
!colspan=9 style=| WCC tournament

|-
!colspan=12 style=| NIT

Source

Rankings

*AP does not release post-NCAA Tournament rankings

References

Saint Mary's
Saint Mary's Gaels men's basketball seasons
Saint Mary's
Saint Mary's
Saint Mary's